Volčje is a small settlement north of Nova Vas in the Municipality of Bloke in the Inner Carniola region of Slovenia.

Church

The local church in the settlement is dedicated to Wolfgang of Regensburg and belongs to the Parish of Bloke.

References

External links

Volčje on Geopedia

Populated places in the Municipality of Bloke